Yarnscombe is a small village and parish in the Torridge area of Devon, England. In the year 2001 census the population was recorded at 300.

Parish Church
The parish church is dedicated to St Andrew. The nave, chancel and transeptal north tower probably date from the 13th century, while the south aisle and porch are 15th century. A vestry was added in 1846. The position of the tower is unusual for Devon. The Church contains some medieval tiles and glass. The 15th century altar-tomb on the north side of the chancel is that of John (or Nicholas) Cockworthy, of the estate of Cockworthy in the parish,  and his wife. The church was repaired in 1852.

Village Hall

The Village Hall which is available to hire for parties, wedding receptions etc. The Hall is also home to a variety of activities such as a Youth Club, Bingo, Badminton, Skittles Teams and Short Mat Bowling, all of which are open to new members/participators.

Methodist Church
Yarnscombe Methodist Church was built in 1908 replacing a wood building built in 1861. The original building was a Bible Christian chapel described by the North Devon Journal as "a wooded structure, built upon six wheels, the object of which is to prevent its becoming the property of the owner of the soil on the expiration of the lease on which it is granted to the present lessee." Shortly after the foundation stones for the new church were laid, the Bible Christian Church in England merged with other Methodist denominations to form the United Methodist Church. The Yarnscombe United Methodist Church closed in 1993, and the building was converted to a private residence.

History
Historically it formed part of Hartland Hundred. It falls within Torrington Deanery for ecclesiastical purposes.

Historic estates
Langley, the historic seat of a junior branch of the Pollard family.

External links 

 Yarnscombe Website, The official website of the village
 Yarnscombe Online, site created by some of the youth of the village
 Devon Libraries Local Studies Service
 GENUKI Yarnscombe

Villages in Devon
Torridge District